{{Infobox television
| image                = The Resistance with Keith Olbermann.png
| image_size           = 250
| alt_name             = The Closer with KeithOlbermann (2016)
| native_name          =
| genre                = Political criticism
| creator              = 
| based_on             = 
| developer            = 
| writer               = 
| screenplay           = 
| story                = 
| director             = Dorenna Newton
| creative_director    = Dorenna Newton
| presenter            = Keith Olbermann
| starring             = 
| judges               = 
| voices               = 
| narrated             = 
| theme_music_composer = 
| opentheme            = 
| endtheme             = 
| composer             = 
| country              = United States
| language             = English
| num_seasons          = 2
| num_episodes         = 147
| list_episodes        = 
| executive_producer   = 
| producer             = 
| news_editor          = 
| location             = 
| cinematography       = 
| editor               = 
| camera               = 
| runtime              = 
| company              = 
| distributor          = 
| budget               = 
| network              = GQ| picture_format       = 16:9 HDTV
| audio_format         = 
| released             = 
| first_aired          = 
| last_aired           = 
| preceded_by          = 
| followed_by          = 
| related              =  
}}The Resistance with Keith Olbermann (originally titled The Closer with Keith Olbermann) was a political web series hosted by Keith Olbermann for GQ. It premiered on September 13, 2016 and ended on November 27, 2017. Typically three new episodes were posted every week and centered around criticism of then presidential Candidate, and later President Donald Trump. They are stylistically similar to the Special Comments from Olbermann's previous work, Countdown with Keith Olbermann.

On November 27, 2017, Olbermann announced his retirement from political commentary after episode 147 had aired, citing his belief that "this . . . presidency of Donald John Trump will end prematurely and end soon, and I am thus also confident that this is the correct moment to end this series of commentaries". (Trump would ultimately end up serving a full term.)

History
It premiered on September 13, 2016 as The Closer with Keith Olbermann. After Donald Trump won the 2016 U.S. presidential election, it was retitled The Resistance with Keith Olbermann.''

Among the series' segments is one in which he criticized Rudy Giuliani for questioning Hillary Clinton's health, noting that Clinton did not question Giuliani's health when she was running for the Senate from New York, even though he previously had prostate cancer.

Impact 
As of March 2017, this series has nearly 170 million views on GQ's YouTube and Facebook.

As of October 23, 2016, the first episode of the series had been viewed more than 800,000 times on YouTube.

The web series also yielded a book adaption of the commentaries, "Trump is F*cking Crazy
(This is not a joke)", announced in September 2017 and released in October 2017.

References

External links

GQ (magazine)
2016 web series debuts
2017 web series endings
American non-fiction web series
Criticism of Donald Trump
Media about the Trump presidency
Political web series